The RBU-1200 (Russian: Реактивно-Бомбовая Установка, Reaktivno-Bombovaja Ustanovka; reaction engine-bomb installation & Смерч; waterspout) is a Russian anti submarine rocket launcher. The weapon system is remotely similar to the British Hedgehog anti submarine rocket launcher from the Second World War.

Description

The system is very light and was developed in 1955 especially for smaller vessels. It can not be swiveled horizontally, it is targeted with the entire ship, which is a serious disadvantage of the weapon system.

The RBU-1200 has five launcher pipes in one system. Reloading is done manually.

The system is controlled by a PUS-B "Uragan" fire control system.

The system is designed to destroy submarines and torpedoes.

Ammunition RGB-12 uses contact fuzes. The launch is made of solid rocket fuel, the flight itself is ballistic arc with a long range from 400 to 1200 meters. The contact lighter K-3, K-3M, or combined contact-remote lighter KDV is used as a lighter. Lighter K-3 / K-3M activates the warhead in direct hit target (or impact on the bottom), KDV lighter outside impact on the target (bottom) in the range of 25-330 meters can also be set to activate when reaching the specified depths in the range 10-330 meters.

Technical data

Launcher

 Weight: 620 kg (empty)
 Length: 1.38 m
 Height: 1.1 m
 Width: 1,115 m
 Elevation: 0 to 51 °
 Traverse: 0°

RGB-12 projectile
 Weight: 73 kg
 Warhead: 30 kg
 Diameter: 251.7 mm
 Length: 1.24 m
 Range: 400 m to 1200 m
 Depth: up to 350 m
 Rate of descent: 6.25 m/s

Operators
Ship classes fitted with RBU-1200 (list not complete):

Kronshtadt-class submarine chaser

Haizhui-class submarine chaser
Type 037 submarine chaser
Type 053H1 frigate
Type 053H2 frigate

Type 051 destroyer
Type 052 destroyer
Type 053H1 frigate

Kronshtadt-class submarine chaser
Pauk-class corvette

Pauk-class corvette
Kronshtadt-class submarine chaser

Hämeenmaa-class minelayer
Kiisla-class patrol boat
Kronshtadt-class submarine chaser

Kronshtadt-class submarine chaser

Abhay-class corvette

Natya-class minesweeper

Aung Zeya-class frigate
Kyan Sittha-class frigate
Type 053H1 frigate
Anawrahta-class corvette
Yan Nyein Aung-class submarine chaser
Hainan-class submarine chaser

Kronshtadt-class submarine chaser

Kronshtadt-class submarine chaser

Project 1241.2 (Pauk class)
Project 266M (Natya class)
Kronshtadt-class submarine chaser

Natya-class minesweeper
 Vietnam People's Navy Vietnam People's Ground Force
Installed on Vietnam People's Navy's decommissioned Project 201 subchasers. Usable systems are transferred to the Vietnam People's Ground Force for ground-attacking roles.Refurbishing, upgrading and resembling projects are reported.

Project 12 (Hai-class)

See also
 RBU-1000
 RBU-2500
 RBU-6000
 RBU-12000

References

 The Naval Institute Guide to World Naval Systems 1997-1998
 Warfare.ru Smerch system

External links 
 Реактивная бомбометная установка РБУ-1200 of milrus.com (russian)
 World-Wide Ahead Throwing ASW Weapons of alternatewars.com

Naval weapons of the Cold War
Anti-submarine missiles
Cold War weapons of the Soviet Union